Gilbert Le Chenadec (born 13 July 1938 in Languidic) is a retired French footballer who represented the France national football team.

Club career
He played youth football at US Montagnarde and FC Lorient. He was then spotted by FC Nantes and won the French championship twice in 1965 and 1966. He ended his career with stints at FC Metz and AS Angoulême.

References

External links
 Player profile at FFF
 FC Metz profile

1938 births
Living people
Sportspeople from Morbihan
French footballers
France international footballers
FC Lorient players
FC Nantes players
FC Metz players
Angoulême Charente FC players
Ligue 1 players
Ligue 2 players
Association football defenders
Footballers from Brittany